Agha Shahi (25 August 1920 – 6 September 2006), NI, was a Pakistani career Foreign service officer who was the leading civilian figure in the military government of former President General Zia-ul-Haq from 1977 to 1982. A diplomat and technocrat by profession, he joined Foreign Services in 1951 and held important diplomatic assignments in the United States, China, and the United Nations. He served as the Foreign secretary— the leading bureaucratic position in Pakistan Government— in 1973 until 1977, after Zulfikar Ali Bhutto's government was dismissed (see Codename Fair Play).

However, he immediately served as the foreign policy adviser to upcoming Chief Martial Law Administrator General Zia-ul-Haq who appointed him as the Foreign Minister shortly after assuming the control of the country. In 1982, after losing General Zia's favour when he made an attempt to keep country on Non-Aligned Movement membership, he lost the foreign affairs ministry to senior military officer Lieutenant-General Yakob Ali Khan. His relationship with General Zia-ul-Haq and his military government further deteriorated, with General Zia complaining about Shahi's speech on improving Pakistan's relations with Soviet Union and the Non-Aligned Movement.  He departed from country in 1982 to join the United Nations General Assembly and served as the Chairman of UN Committee on Elimination of Racial Discrimination until 1990, and served as the Chairman of the Pakistan delegation at World Conference on Human Rights. During his last years, he associated with the Institute of Strategic Studies (ISS), Islamabad where he served as its President until his death.

Diplomatic career
Agha Shahi was born in Bangalore, former Mysore state and present-day Karnataka, India to the Urdu-speaking community, the son of educator who was the local principal of British government-sanctioned school.  He was educated in Bangalore, excelling the science courses he took in school. In 1939, Shahi enrolled in Indian Institute of Science where he joined the Department of Physics, and receiving his BSc in Physics, followed by MSc in applied physics and MA in Mathematics in 1944. Following his master's degree, he joined the faculty of Mathematics teaching undergraduate calculus courses but his parents were unsatisfied of their son being a scientist; therefore, encouraged by his parents, Shahi soon left his position after applying at the Indian Civil Service in 1944. He took the advanced exam, "All India Competitive Examinations", where he excelled and was commissioned in the Indian civil service soon after. His first assignment was Sindh Province as a Commission of Education Department, and the family moved to Karachi, Sindh. In 1947, he opted for Pakistan citizenship, and served as the constitutional adviser to Chief Ministers of Sindh Province Ghulam Hussain Hidayat Ullah from 1947 till 1948, and to Ayub Khuhro from 1948 until 1949. In 1949, the Governor George Baxandall Constantine appointed him as the Commissioner of District Thatta. In 1967, Shahi gained a Master of Science in Strategic studies from Defence & Strategic Studies (DSS) Department. Shahi had a long career as a Pakistani diplomat, beginning in 1951. He served as Pakistan's ambassador to the United Nations, and China and also served in many other positions.

Early career as an ambassador
He opted for the Foreign Service of Pakistan in 1951 and played a prominent role in formulation of foreign policy right from the early years of Pakistan's creation. He was part of various delegations to the United Nations during the 1950s and 1960s and served with A.S. Bokhari (known as Patras Bokhari), Sir Muhammad Zafrulla Khan and Prince Aly Khan (father of Prince Karim Aga Khan and Pakistan's permanent representative to UN).

Shahi served as Counselor in the Pakistan Embassy in Washington from 1955–58. He was Pakistan's Deputy Permanent Representative to UN from 1958–61 and later served as Permanent Representative to United Nations from 1967–72. During his term as permanent representative to United Nations, he played an important role in enabling China to become a member of the United Nations. He became Additional Secretary in the Ministry of Foreign Affairs in 1964 and served in that position till 1967.

Foreign Minister of Pakistan
In 1972, he was appointed Pakistan's Ambassador to China. In 1973, Shahi became Foreign Secretary and served in that position till the fall of Prime Minister Zulfikar Ali Bhutto in 1977. Shahi was appointed Advisor on foreign affairs/foreign minister in 1977 by General Muhammad Zia-ul-Haq and resigned from the position of foreign minister in 1982, after developing serious differences with General Zia.

Post-resignation activities
Shahi led various delegations of Pakistan to UN General Assembly, conferences of Non-Aligned Movement and Organization of Islamic Conference. He was a member of various UN commissions and was also elected Chairman of the UN Committee on Elimination of Racial Discrimination (CERD) of which he had been a member since 1982. In 1993, Shahi was Co-Chairman of the Pakistan delegation to the World Conference on Human Rights held in Vienna. Shahi also served as Chairman of Institute of Strategic Studies in Islamabad and headed Islamabad Council of World Affairs – a private think tank.

He was the younger brother of Agha Hilaly who also joined ICS and later opted for Pakistan's foreign service, serving as Pakistan's Ambassador in important capitals such as London, Moscow and Washington (at a time when his younger brother Shahi was Pakistan's permanent representative to UN in New York). Agha Hilaly's son, Zafar Hilaly (who is also a former diplomat), is Agha Shahi's nephew.

Death and legacy
On 6 September 2006, he died after suffering a heart attack, at the Pakistan Institute of Medical Sciences in Islamabad, aged 86.

Pakistan's foreign minister in 2006, Khurshid Mahmood Kasuri, reportedly commented on Agha Shahi's death, "Agha Shahi served in various key positions in the Foreign Ministry with great distinction rising to the position of foreign secretary and foreign minister. A generation of Pakistani diplomats had the fortune to learn from him."

See also
Agha Hilaly

Further reading

References

External links
Pakistan's ex-Foreign Minister Agha Shahi passes away from the Pakistan Times (newspaper) (archived)

|-

1920 births
2006 deaths
Politicians from Bangalore
Muhajir people
Foreign Ministers of Pakistan
Foreign Secretaries of Pakistan
Members of the Committee on the Elimination of Racial Discrimination
Permanent Representatives of Pakistan to the United Nations
Ambassadors of Pakistan to China
Indian Civil Service (British India) officers
Project-706
Recipients of Nishan-e-Imtiaz
Pakistani civil servants
Pakistani scholars
Military government of Pakistan (1977–1988)
Pakistani anti-communists
People from Karachi
Indian Institute of Science alumni
Pakistani officials of the United Nations